Ronnie Roemisch is an American football coach. He served as head coach at his alma mater, Tarleton State University, from 1993 to 1995. He compiled a 9–21–1 record overall. Roemisch was fired after a 1–10 season in 1995, and replaced with Todd Whitten.

Roemisch is a German Texan. His last name means “Roman” in German.

References

Year of birth missing (living people)
Living people
Tarleton State Texans football coaches
Tarleton State Texans football players